Hard Matter is an upcoming American action thriller film written and directed by Justin Price and starring Harvey Keitel, Frank Grillo, Peter Stormare and Tyrese Gibson.

Premise
A power-hungry corporation has taken over the conventional prison system and made criminals the new law enforcers.

Cast
Harvey Keitel
Peter Stormare
Franzi Schissler
Frank Grillo
Tyrese Gibson

Production
In February 2022, it was announced that Keitel, Stormare and Schissler were cast in the film.  Later that same month, it was announced that Grillo joined the cast.  In March 2022, it was announced that Gibson joined the cast.

Filming occurred in Biloxi, Mississippi in February 2022.  Filming also occurred in Gulfport, Mississippi in March 2022.

References

External links
 

Upcoming films
American action thriller films
Films shot in Mississippi